Robert Jackson (born December 18, 1950) is an American politician in New York City. A member of the Democratic Party, he is the Senator for the New York State Senate's 31st district on the West Side of Manhattan. He previously served in the New York City Council from 2002 to 2013, representing the 7th district in Manhattan. He is the first Muslim New York State Senator.

Early life and education
Robert Jackson was born in Harlem, the son of Zelma Jackson and Chinese immigrant Eddie Chu. He grew up in Manhattan and The Bronx, attending P.S.186 in Washington Heights, and P.S. 146, Junior High School 120, and Benjamin Franklin High School in The Bronx. As a child, he sold newspapers. Jackson graduated from the State University of New York at New Paltz in 1975. After college, he worked for the New York State Department of Labor and the Public Employees Federation, a labor union. In 1986, he was elected to New York City Community School Board 6.

Campaign for Fiscal Equity 
In 1992, Jackson was serving as the elected president of Community School Board 6. He sued the state, frustrated and accusing the state of under-funding New York City public schools. Jackson sought assistance from the school board's attorney, Michael A. Rebell; they founded the Campaign for Fiscal Equity, and in 1993 filed suit in CFE v. State of New York. The lawsuit argued that the State of New York's method of allocating funds for public education did not provide adequately for children in New York City, and therefore violated the New York State Constitution and the federal Civil Rights Act.

On June 26, 2003, the New York State Court of Appeals (the state's highest court) ruled in favor of plaintiffs, and gave the State until July 30, 2004, to implement changes. However, lawmakers could not agree on a formula. The Court of Appeals appointed a special panel to address the problem, and in 2005, the panel proposed that NY City schools receive an extra $5.6 billion per year. Justice Leland DeGrasse accepted that solution, and in 2007, the Legislature established the Foundation Aid Formula to distribute the requisite funds, phased in over a period of four years. Because of the subsequent fiscal crisis, funding was frozen during 2009–2012. Full funding has yet to be restored, a situation Jackson protested both in Albany and New York City.

New York City Council
Robert Jackson was elected to the New York City Council's 7th district in 2001 as a Democrat. Before it was redistricted in 2013, the district included portions of the neighborhoods Harlem, Washington Heights and Inwood. He served parts of his three terms as Education Committee Chair and co-chair of the Black, Latino and Asian Caucus with Council Member Fernando Cabrera. Jackson was twice re-elected before being term-limited in 2013.

Jackson is Muslim, and was the only Muslim City Council member during his tenure.

2013 Manhattan Borough President campaign
Jackson announced in late January 2013 that he was running in the Democratic Primary for Manhattan Borough President. Jackson highlighted the Campaign for Fiscal Equity as a significant accomplishment in at least five campaigns since he initially ran, and won a seat on, the New York City Council in 2001, and his literature stated Jackson "brought home billions of additional dollars each year to improve our public schools," though the Campaign for Fiscal Equity was called a failure by the Village Voice.

Jackson, who was the only male or black candidate in the race, received the endorsement of former mayor David Dinkins, New York City's first Black mayor, prior to announcing. His opponents in the Democratic Primary were former city council members Jessica Lappin and Gale Brewer, as well as small business owner and former Chair of Community Board 1, Julie Menin. Jackson lost the Democratic Primary election to Brewer, coming in third place with 19% of the vote, compared to Brewer's 40% and Lappin's 25%.

New York State Senate

2014 campaign
In 2014, Jackson for ran for the New York State Senate in the 31st State Senate district against the incumbent, Adriano Espaillat. In the September 2014 Democratic primary election, he lost with roughly 43% of the vote to Espaillat's 50%, and Luis Tejada's 7%, in a race described by the New York Daily News as "his second shot at a campaign in less than a year." Jackson's campaign manager, Michael Oliva, said that there were no specific plans moving forward, and quoted Jackson as saying he's "not going to deal with this bullshit for another two years."

2016 campaign
In 2016, Espaillat ran for U.S. House of Representatives to replace retiring long-term Congressman Charlie Rangel of Harlem; Jackson ran for Espaillat's seat in State Senate District 31 once again. In a tight primary race, Jackson came in 3rd place with 30% of the vote, losing to District Leader Marisol Alcantara, Espaillat's chosen successor, with 33% of the vote, and Bloomberg administration alumnus Micah Lasher with 31% of the vote, while again defeating Luis Tejada with 5% of the vote.

2018 campaign
In 2018, Jackson ran for State Senate District 31 for the third time. In the September 2018 Democratic primary election, he won with 56% of the vote, defeating Alcantara, the incumbent, with 39% of the vote, Tirso Pina with 4% of the vote and Thomas Leon with 1% of the vote. Jackson's victory was attributed to backlash against Alcantara, who in the State Senate had joined the Independent Democratic Conference, a group of Democratic senators who allied themselves with the Senate Republican Conference that controlled the chamber. Jackson had the support of 2016 rival Micah Lasher.

In November 2018, Jackson easily won the general election in the heavily Democratic district with 89% of the vote, becoming the first Muslim state senator. In the Senate, Jackson is serving as Chairman of Committee on Cities.

Controversies

Bill Thompson heckling
On February 1, 2013, a Democratic mayoral forum was held in Washington Heights. Elected officials repeatedly neglected to acknowledge City Councilman Robert Jackson, who represented the area. Finally, when black mayoral candidate Bill Thompson greeted State Senator A. Espaillat, Assemblywoman G. Rosa, and Councilman Y. Rodriguez, Mr. Jackson called out, "I'm not part of the Northern Manhattan team? ... Can you see? Hello? Am I black enough for you, brother?" Thompson responded that he had no intention of ignoring Jackson, and referred to him as a "hero" for his fight for NY City schools.

Fairway Market lawsuit
In February 2013 Jackson, and his wife Faika Jackson, sued Fairway Market and New York City. The Jacksons claimed Faika tripped over a downed stop sign in front of the Harlem location of the market in April 2010. In July 2014, Manhattan Supreme Court Judge Margaret Chan admonished the Jacksons for "non-compliance with Fairway's repeated discovery demands," saying they had failed to provide medical records related to Faika's stop sign tumble. Jackson also joined his wife's lawsuit as a co-plaintiff, writing that his wife's injuries prevented her from providing "services, society and companionship."

Climate change banner
Jackson and Senator Rachel May received criticism in March 2022 after attending a rally organized by NY Renews, where they posed with a sign that compared climate change to the September 11 attacks. The sign used imagery that depicted a plane flying into the World Trade Center, with "climate change" captioned over the plane. Jackson was captured helping hold the sign up, and reading aloud from it. Jackson apologized for the incident, stating "the artwork depicted is wrong and I fully reject it."

Personal life
Jackson has three daughters. He met his wife, Faika Jackson, while in college. He currently lives with his family in Washington Heights.

References

Further reading
Paterson, David "Black, Blind, & In Charge: A Story of Visionary Leadership and Overcoming Adversity."Skyhorse Publishing. New York, New York, 2020

External links
 Robert Jackson's official campaign website

Living people
American Muslims
State University of New York at New Paltz alumni
21st-century American politicians
New York City Council members
Democratic Party New York (state) state senators
1950 births
African-American New York City Council members
Asian-American New York City Council members